Several church councils were held in Braga in the Middle Ages. Braga was the metropolitan of an ecclesiastical province and it was the chief bishopric of the Kingdom of Galicia during the Suevic period and in the High Middle Ages. 
Council of Braga (411), probably an invention of Father Bernardo Brito
Council of Braga (561)
Council of Braga (572)
Council of Braga (675)
Council of Braga (1278–1280)
Council of Braga (1301)
Council of Braga (1328)
Council of Braga (1436)
Council of Braga (1488)
Council of Braga (1537)